Wonders of Life: Exploring the Most Extraordinary Phenomenon in the Universe is a 2013 book by the theoretical physicists Brian Cox and Andrew Cohen.

Overview
The book aims to explore the mystery of where life came from and what it is, and is explained in a way that is accessible to a general reader. The book is based on a series with the same name Wonders of Life.

References

External links
profile on Google books

2013 non-fiction books
Popular science books
HarperCollins books